Jean Allison (born October 24, 1929) is an American actress.

She appeared in numerous films and TV series throughout the 1950s to the 1980s.

Biography
Allison was born in New York City on October 24, 1929. She made her debut on television in the mid-1950s and was credited with a host of minor roles and appearances as guest star in dozens of episodes of television series.

She appeared in one episode of The Rifleman;  two episodes each of The Californians, Schlitz Playhouse of Stars,  One Step Beyond, Mickey Spillane's Mike Hammer,  Law of the Plainsman, The Alaskans, Hawaiian Eye,  Wanted Dead or Alive, The Detectives, Laramie, Dr. Kildare, Bonanza chapter 26 first season, Gunsmoke,Owen Marshall: Counselor at Law, Charlie's Angels; three episodes of Sheriff of Cochise and 77 Sunset Strip; and four episodes of Emergency! On Adam-12, she played a woman involved in a 415 (domestic dispute) in an episode that aired on March 7, 1973. She was on Starsky & Hutch for a double episode as Helen Yeager in 1977.

Allison also appeared in secondary roles in several films: as Eleanor Hackett in Edge of Fury, as Nell Lucas in Devil's Partner, as Florence Maguire in The Steagle, as Mrs. Dixon in Bad Company and as Mrs. Steensma in Hardcore. In 1971 and 1974, Allison had minor roles in ABC movies of the week: first in Aaron Spelling's The Death of Me Yet, then in The Elevator. She also had a support role in the 1977 NBC  made-for-television movie The Strange Possession of Mrs. Oliver.

Her last appearance on television was in 1984 on the series Highway to Heaven.

Selected filmography

Film
 Edge of Fury (1958)
 Devil's Partner (1961)
 The Steagle (1971)
 Bad Company (1972)
 Hardcore (1979)

Television

 General Electric Theater (1957)
 Schlitz Playhouse of Stars (1959) Episode: Shotgun Slade-The Salted Mine
 The Californians (1958-1959)
 Mickey Spillane's Mike Hammer (1958-1959)
 Whirlybirds (1958-1959)
 Have Gun - Will Travel (1958)
 Letter to Loretta (1958)
 The Restless Gun (1958) in Episode "Jebediah Bonner"
 M Squad (1958)
 Maverick (1958)
 The Rough Riders (1958)
 Trackdown (1958)
 Wanted Dead or Alive (1959-1961)
 One Step Beyond (1959) Episode: "Twelve Hours to Live"
 Sugarfoot (1959)
 Bourbon Street Beat (1959)
 Lawman (1959) Episode: "The Posse"
 Rawhide (1959)
 Bronco (1960) Episode: "Death of an Outlaw"
 One Step Beyond (1960) Episode: "Tidalwave"
 Johnny Ringo (1960) 
 Bonanza (1960) Episode: "The Avenger"
 Perry Mason (1961)
Hennesey (1961) Episode: "Hennesey vs. Crandall"
 The Rifleman (1961)
 Bat Masterson (1961)
 The Dick Van Dyke Show (1963)
 Gunsmoke (1970-1974)
 Bewitched (1970)
 ‘’Adam-12’’ (1973)
 Emergency! (1976)
 The Bionic Woman (1976) Episode: "Angel of Mercy"

References

External links
 

1929 births
Living people
American film actresses
American television actresses
Actresses from New York City
21st-century American women